Hüllhorst Comprehensive School is located in Hüllhorst, Nordrhein-Westfalen, Germany, and has about 1,250 pupils on roll. The school's staff includes over 95 teachers. In addition to their normal names, all classes from grade 5 to 10 are also named after a tree or bush of the Central European area 
which can be found on the school grounds as well.

The school's catchment includes  Ahlsen, Büttendorf, Bröderhausen, Holsen, Hüllhorst, Huchzen, Oberbauerschaft, Schnathorst, Tengern and Lübbecke.

Partner 
Partners of Hüllhorst Comprehensive School are the education and culture lifelong learning programme "COMENIUS" and "AUBI-plus".

External links 
 School web site

References

Schools in North Rhine-Westphalia
Minden-Lübbecke